A by-election was held for the New South Wales Legislative Assembly seat of Lakemba on 18 October 2008 after former Premier Morris Iemma resigned as member for Lakemba. By-elections for the seats of Cabramatta, Port Macquarie and Ryde were held on the same day.

The seat was retained by the Labor Party at the by-election.

Dates

Results

See also
Electoral results for the district of Lakemba
List of New South Wales state by-elections

References

External links
 ABC District Profile & Election Coverage

2008 elections in Australia
New South Wales state by-elections
2000s in New South Wales